Thryssa hamiltonii, or Hamilton's thryssa, is a species of ray-finned fish in the family Engraulidae. It is found in the tropical western Indo-Pacific region: mainly, the eastern direction near Myanmar, Taiwan, the northern head of Australia and Papua New Guinea and possibly the Philippines.

Although the patronym was not identified but clearly in honor of Francis Hamilton-Buchanan (1762-1829), Scottish physician and naturalist, who published an influential account of Indo-Gangetic fishes in 1822.

References

Fish of Thailand
Taxa named by John Edward Gray
Fish described in 1835
hamiltonii